Henry "Harry" Redfern (April 1861 – 6 March 1950) was a British architect.

Early life
Born in April 1861, he was educated at Abingdon School from 1871 to 1877.

Career
Redfern designed work in Oxford, Cambridge, Abingdon and Carlisle. At the University of Cambridge he was the architect of the chemical, metallurgical, physical and biological laboratories, and restored portions of Christ's College and Magdalene College. At Oxford he carried out additions and restoration work at Oriel College and St John's College; and was architect of the biochemistry laboratories.

At Abingdon he completed work at St Michael's church, the Malthouse, designed the lodge at Abingdon School (where he was educated) and restored the school's Roysse Room (1911). He was responsible for designing, in an imaginative and varied manner, a number of notable public houses in the Carlisle district, as chief architect of the Home Office State Management Scheme (SMS). The scheme built fourteen New Model Inns to Redfern's designs, with a strong theme of the Arts and Crafts movement. He was particularly interested in restoring and designing churches.

He was commemorated towards the end of his work for the SMS by the naming of the Redfern Inn (1938), one of the distinctive New Model Inn designs, in Etterby, a district of Carlisle.  The Redfern was designed by his assistant architect, Joseph Seddon FRIBA (with Redfern's collaboration). It was a tribute to a man who had dedicated his talents to the quest for an improved public house style.

Redfern practised from Porchester Gardens, London, and later lived at St Dunstan's Gardens, Ealing. His early business partner was J. J. Stevenson FSA (1831–1908). He was author of the article: Some Recollections of William Butterfield and Henry Woodyer (1950).

His obituary is found in the Journal of the RIBA following his death on 6 March 1950.

See also
 List of Old Abingdonians

References

Further reading
 The Carlisle State Management Scheme: Its Ethos and Architecture, Olive Seabury, Bookcase Carlisle 2007, 
 A City Under The Influence - The story of half a century of state pubs, John Hunt, Lakescene 1971,

External links
 Dictionary of Scottish Architects

1861 births
1950 deaths
19th-century English architects
20th-century English architects
People educated at Abingdon School